The 2014 Rochdale Metropolitan Borough Council election took place on 22 May 2014 to elect members of Rochdale Metropolitan Borough Council in England. This was on the same day as other local elections.

The Labour Party retained control of the Council

After the election, the composition of the council was:
Labour 48
Conservative 11
Liberal Democrat 1

Election result

Ward results

Balderstone & Kirkholt ward

Bamford ward

Castleton ward

Central Rochdale ward

East Middleton ward

Healey ward

Hopwood Hall ward

Kingsway ward

Littleborough Lakeside ward

Milkstone & Deeplish ward

Milnrow & Newhey ward

Norden ward

North Heywood ward

North Middleton ward

Smallbridge & Firgrove ward

South Middleton ward

Spotland & Falinge ward

Wardle & West Littleborough ward

West Heywood ward

West Middleton ward

References

2014 English local elections
2014
2010s in Greater Manchester